Love Is in the Air is a 2011 Danish musical film directed by Simon Staho.

Cast
 Emma Sehested Høeg as Lina
 Gustav Hintze as Daniel
 Victoria Carmen Sonne as Therese
 Anton Honik as Stefan (as Honik)
 Laust Sonne as Niklas Ravn
 Dar Salim as Benny
 Henning Valin Jakobsen as Stefans far (as Henning Valin)
 Mette Frank as Stefans mor
 Birgitte Hjort Sørensen as Niklas Ravns kæreste
 Claus Gerving as Daniels far

References

External links
 

2011 films
2010s musical films
Danish musical films
2010s Danish-language films